Mumia is a bacterial genus from the family Nocardioidaceae.

References

Propionibacteriales
Bacteria genera